Claudi is a masculine given name which may refer to:

 Claudi Arimany (born 1955), Spanish/Catalan flautist
 Claudi L. H. Bockting (born 1969), Dutch clinical psychologist and professor
 Claudi Lorenzale (1814–1889), Spanish painter
 Claudi Martí (born 1940), Occitan singer

See also
 Claudio

Masculine given names